Wilco Nienaber (born 7 April 2000) is a South African professional golfer. He won the 2021 Dimension Data Pro-Am. He plays on the European Tour and is known for his long distance off the tee.

Amateur career
Nienaber won several amateur events in Africa and represented South Africa at the 2018 Eisenhower Trophy in Ireland, where he finished 3 under par individually. He made his European Tour debut as an amateur in December 2018 at the South African Open at Randpark Golf Club, north of Johannesburg, where he opened with two rounds of 69 to make the cut.

His best ranking on the World Amateur Golf Ranking was 28th.

Professional career
Nienaber turned professional in the middle of 2019. His European Tour debut as a professional was made in late November 2019 at the Alfred Dunhill Championship at Leopard Creek CC, Malelane, South Africa, where he finished tied 24th, earning €14,000. 

In February 2020, also in his homeland of South Africa, he came close to his first professional win, finishing runner-up in the Limpopo Championship on the Challenge Tour. 

In August 2020, Nienaber recorded his first top-10 on the European Tour; finishing 4th in the Hero Open at Forest of Arden CC, England.

In September 2020, 14 months after turning professional, Nienaber advanced to 270th on the Official World Golf Ranking. In the second round of the Joburg Open in November 2020 at Randpark Golf Club in Johannesburg, South Africa, Nienaber hit his drive on the 597-yard, par-5 4th hole a European Tour season record 439 yards. It was also 16 yards longer than the PGA Tour season record at the time. He eventually finished in second place; two shots behind Joachim B. Hansen, and reached a career best 209th on the Official World Golf Ranking.

In May 2021, Nienaber claimed his first professional victory at the Dimension Data Pro-Am. He beat Henric Sturehed in a playoff and advanced to 135th on the Official World Golf Ranking.

Amateur wins
2017 Northern Cape Amateur Open, Central Gauteng Open Stroke Play
2018 Free State Open, Western Province Amateur Strokeplay
2019 Gauteng North Open, South African Amateur Championship

Source:

Professional wins (1)

Sunshine Tour wins (1)

1Co-sanctioned by the Challenge Tour

Sunshine Tour playoff record (1–0)

Challenge Tour wins (1)

1Co-sanctioned by the Sunshine Tour

Challenge Tour playoff record (1–0)

Results in major championships

"T" = tied

Results in World Golf Championships

1Cancelled due to COVID-19 pandemic

NT = No tournament

Team appearances
Amateur
Eisenhower Trophy (representing South Africa): 2018

References

External links

South African male golfers
Sunshine Tour golfers
European Tour golfers
Sportspeople from Bloemfontein
2000 births
Living people